Eirmotus isthmus is a species of cyprinid in the genus Eirmotus. It lives in Sumatra and Borneo in Indonesia, and its habitat is lakes and other bodies of water on floodplains. It has a maximum length of 3.3 cm (1.3 inches).

References

Cyprinidae
Cyprinid fish of Asia
Fish of Indonesia